Japonicana is the debut studio album by Japanese singer-songwriter Jin Akanishi. It was simultaneously released in the United States on March 6, both physically and in major digital stores, and day after on March 7 in Japan, by Warner Music Group.

Background
On January 6, 2012, was held a sold-out concert at 12,000 seat Yokohama Arena, which was streamed live at the Grammy Museum. In the same month, on January 24 was released digital single "Sun Burns Down".

Release
The album's name is a combination of Japan and America, while the last part is taken from the Spanish "a" sound, which makes a noun feminine. On his debut studio album, Akanishi collaborated with The Stereotypes and Static Revenger.

It was released in the United States and Japan in different editions. The United States physical edition compared to the digital on iTunes lacks a bonus track "Tell Me Where", while Japanese in addition have "Body Talk", "Yellow Gold" (standard), "Magnitude" (standard) and "Bass Go Boom" (limited).

Touring
From March 9 to 17 was held a promotional concert tour, which started at Club Nokia in Los Angeles, and continued at Centre For Performing Arts in Vancouver, Hawaii Theatre in Honolulu, Best Buy Theater in New York City, and The Warfield in San Francisco.

In Japan from April to May was scheduled to hold 7 concerts in 5 cities including Tokyo and Osaka for a total of 70,000 people, but his further plans were abruptly cancelled due to a penalty by his own agency Johnny's Entertainment because he didn't contact his agency beforehand to report his marriage at the time.

Chart performance
The album has debuted on the Oricon's daily album charts at number one, and stayed as the number two on the weekly charts, selling 69,887 copies in its first week of release. It charted for seven weeks, and with 80,331 copies sold it was the 86th best-selling album of the year in Japan.

It was certified Gold by RIAJ denoting over 100,000 shipments.

On the Billboards Japan Top Albums chart peaked at number two. On the American Billboard charts peaked at number ten on Dance/Electronic Albums charts, number thirteen on Heatseekers Albums, number two on Heatseekers Pacific, and number ten on Heatseekers Middle Atlantic chart.

Track listing

Charts

References

External links
U.S. Japonicana on iTunes

2012 debut albums
Jin Akanishi albums